Nicholas Caglioni (born 14 January 1983) is an Italian football goalkeeper.

Career
Formerly a Serie A player for Messina with a total 11 appearances in the Italian top flight, Caglioni was banned from football for two years after he was found positive to cocaine after a Serie A match against Catania on February 11, 2007. His ban was expired on March 15, 2009; after the expiring, he joined Pro Patria of Lega Pro Prima Divisione.

In January 2011 he joined Salernitana on a free transfer, serving as first-choice keeper in the club's rise into the promotion playoffs, then lost to Verona. In July 2011 he joined Serie B club Modena, after his contract with Salernitana expired.

References

External links
 Career profile at AIC.Football.it

1983 births
Living people
Sportspeople from the Province of Bergamo
Italian footballers
Association football goalkeepers
Atalanta B.C. players
A.C.R. Messina players
Aurora Pro Patria 1919 players
U.S. Salernitana 1919 players
Modena F.C. players
F.C. Crotone players
U.S. Lecce players
FeralpiSalò players
Serie A players
Serie B players
Serie C players
Serie D players
Doping cases in association football
Footballers from Lombardy
A.S.D. Fanfulla players